The Canal through Walcheren in the Netherlands crosses the east of Walcheren. It connects the Westerschelde and the Veerse Meer.

Context 
In the 15th and 16th century Middelburg, capital of Zeeland was booming. The city was on Walcheren Island, and had a connection to the sea just to the east via the small river Arne. In 1535 the Havenkanaal was opened, and Middelburg continued in prosperity. However, in the 17th and 18th century Middelburg's connections to the sea all silted up. 

In 1809 King Louis Bonaparte decided to construct the New Harbor Canal, which connected Middelburg to Veere. After the annexation by France this work was halted. After independence was regained in 1813, work continued. It was made possible by a national subsidy (a loan without interest) of 1,000,000 guilders. Middelburg would repay 25,000 guilders a year. The canal was opened in August 1817, but the prosperity of Middelburg was not restored.

History 

In 1871 the Sloedam was constructed for the Roosendaal–Vlissingen railway. The dam connected the islands Walcheren and Zuid-Beveland, and cut off the Sloe, which was the southern approach to Middelburg over water. Therefore, and to profit from the expected benefits of the railway, the new Canal through Walcheren was dug.

On the north side of Middelburg, the Canal through Walcheren follows the bed of the Havenkanaal (New Harbor Canal) of 1817. In Middelburg the canal passed along the fortifications. Here it led to the demolishment of the Vlissingen Gate. In Vlissingen the canal was connected to extensive new harbour works.

The railroad entering Walcheren from the east does not cross this canal, but bends south and runs along it up to Vlissingen.

Today 
All movable bridges (5) and sluices are remote controlled from a central point in Vlissingen, to be comtacted by VHF.
North of the bridges in Middelburg is a branch to the harbour of Arnemuiden for CEMT-class II boats and after a mile on that canal an other branch to the harbour of Nieuw- en Sint Joosland for CEMT-class 0.
Excess waters (rain) from a part of Walcheren is discharged on the canal by a pumping station in Middelburg.

References 
  

Canals in the Rhine–Meuse–Scheldt delta
Canals opened in 1873
Canals in Zeeland
Transport in Middelburg, Zeeland
Transport in Vlissingen
Veere
Walcheren